The 1965 Water Polo European Cup was the second edition of LEN's premier competition for male water polo clubs, running from February to April 1965. Pro Recco, which hosted the final stage, won all three games to win its first title, while defending champions Partizan Belgrade was the runner-up.

Semifinal stage

Final stage

References

LEN Champions League seasons
1965 in water polo